is a manga by Osamu Tezuka, and also the name of one of his books in Kodansha's line of "Osamu Tezuka Manga Complete Works" books containing a collection of Tezuka's short stories.  The stories included in the book are "Son of Godfather", "Spaceship Ringel Rock", "Serenade of a Pig's Navel", "Boy Detective Zumbera", and "The Moon and Wolves".

Son of Godfather

Plot

Characters

Spaceship Ringel Rock

Plot

Characters

Serenade of a Pig's Navel

Plot

Characters

Boy Detective Zumbera

Plot

Characters

The Moon and Wolves

Plot

Characters

See also
List of Osamu Tezuka manga
Osamu Tezuka

References

External links
"Son of Godfather" manga publications page at TezukaOsamu@World

Manga series
Osamu Tezuka manga
Shueisha franchises
1973 manga